Byun Hee-jae (born 22 April 1974) is a South Korean conservative political commentator.

References

Further reading

1974 births
Reporters and correspondents
South Korean journalists
South Korean writers
South Korean columnists
People from Seoul
Living people
South Korean atheists